Convivium may refer to:

Symposium
Convivium, a magazine published by Cardus
Convivium, a short story by Kelli Stanley